Mark John Miller (born 22 September 1962) is an English manager, currently in charge of Żabbar St. Patrick, and former footballer. During his career he played as a midfielder and played in Malta and Finland towards the end of his career.

Career 

After his experience in Finland, Miller returned to Malta and played and managed Floriana. During his time with the Greens they won the Premier League, FA Trophy and the Super Cup.

Miller joined Sliema Wanderers as player/coach during this time he won the Premier League (1994–95)

Miller joined the technical set up of Hibernians in 1996, remaining with the club until 1999. Miller was then associated with the Malta Football Association until 2008, serving as head coach of the Malta national under-21 football team. Following the Premier League triumph in 2008–09, Miller crossed the divide and joined Valletta where he spent two years as manager.

In 2015, Miller took over Qormi, who were bottom of the League, after Josef Mansueto's resignation. In the following season, Miller rejoined Hibernians leading them to another Premier League title, the 12th in their history. In the 2017–18 season, following a run of results which saw them drop to seventh in the League table, Miller and Hibernians mutually parted ways.

He was appointed the head coach of Mosta in November 2018 and left Mosta by mutual agreement in June 2020, after reaching a 9th and an 8th place in the league.

On 22 June 2020 Miller was appointed as new head coach of the Maltese Premier League side Balzan F.C., signing a two-years contract. On 19 October 2021 he stepped down from his position, after a 2–1 defeat against his former team Floriana. In June 2022, Miller was appointed manager of Żabbar St. Patrick.

Honours

Player 

Floriana
 Maltese Premier League: 1992–93 
 Maltese FA Trophy: 1992–93
 Maltese Super Cup: 1992–93

Managerial 

Hibernians
 Maltese Premier League: 2008–09, 2016–17 
 Maltese FA Trophy: 1997–98

Valletta
 Maltese Premier League: 2013–14 
 Maltese FA Trophy: 2013–14

Footnotes

External links
 Mark Miller at HiberniansFC.org

Living people
1962 births
Sportspeople from Tynemouth
Footballers from Tyne and Wear
English footballers
Association football midfielders
Newcastle United F.C. players
Gillingham F.C. players
Whitley Bay F.C. players
Doncaster Rovers F.C. players
Darlington F.C. players
Rabat Ajax F.C. players
Palloiluseura Apollo players
Floriana F.C. players
Sliema Wanderers F.C. players
English Football League players
English football managers
Valletta F.C. managers
Hibernians F.C. managers
Qormi F.C. managers
Mosta F.C. managers
English expatriate football managers
English expatriate sportspeople in Malta
Maltese Premier League managers
English expatriate sportspeople in Finland
Expatriate football managers in Malta
Expatriate footballers in Finland